I Want to Be a Soldier is a drama film released in Spain and at the Rome Film Festival in 2010. It is the fourth feature film of director Christian Molina.

Plot

Alex, a 10-year-old child, develops an unhealthy obsession with morbid imagery, which marks him asocial. Unable to befriend his peers, he creates an imaginary friend and role model, whom he names Astronaut Captain Harry. Upon the birth of his twin baby brothers, Alex feels more neglected than usual. He emotionally extorts his father into buying him a TV for his room, and starts spending hours watching violent programmes. As his antisocial behavior deepens, he also takes on a new imaginary friend, Sergeant John Cluster who will teach him how to realize his new dream of being a great soldier.

Cast
 Fergus Riordan as Alex
 Ben Temple as Astronaut Captain Harry / Sergeant John Cluster
 Andrew Tarbet as Father
 Jo Kelly as Mother
 Valeria Marini as Teacher
 Cassandra Gava
 Josephine Barnes
 Robert Englund as Psychiatrist
 Danny Glover as The Principal

References

External links
 
 
 

2010 films
Spanish drama films
Films scored by Federico Jusid
2010 drama films
2010s English-language films
2010s Spanish films